Mark Lydon (born 1985 in Galway) is an Irish sportsperson. He plays Gaelic football and hurling with his local club Moycullen. He has been a member of the Galway senior inter-county team since 2008 and the Galway  senior hurling team since 2012.

References

Living people
Dual players
Galway inter-county Gaelic footballers
Galway inter-county hurlers
Moycullen Gaelic footballers
1985 births
Moycullen hurlers